Slime Cup is a children's television show broadcast by Nickelodeon in which sixteen teams of players compete in a series of slime-filled challenges. As of 2019, four seasons have been aired.

The series was first broadcast in the US and will be adapted for Australian television on July 1, 2016 with Kristy Best as the host.

The sixteen teams consists of:
Slime Brothers,
Waddling Ducks,
Slime Sisters,
Bubbly Banana Girls,
Double Threat, 
Kooky Cousins, 
Regular Bros,
Dynamite Divas, 
Team Tissue Box,
Soccer Skilled Slimers,
Slime Patrol,
Daring Divas,
Cuckoo Coconuts,
Boss Besties,
Besties in Braids, and
Mini Blacks.

Slime Cup Celebrity Golf Tournament 
In February 2022, Nickelodeon announced it's one-hour episode of Slime Cup Celebrity Tournament. It will feature four teams each with three members, including a professional golfer, a celebrity, and a Nickelodeon star, on a golf course created by the channel itself.

Participants

Professional golfers 

 Jon Rahm
 Collin Morikawa
 Justin Thomas
 Lexi Thompson

NFL players 

 Saquon Barkley and Justin Herbert
 Terry Crews

Nickelodeon actors 

 Isaiah Crews
 Kate Godfrey
 Jaidyn Triplett
 Tyler Wladis
 Gabrielle Nevaeh Green

References

Australian children's television series